Qesarat is a village and a former municipality in the Gjirokastër County, southern Albania. At the 2015 local government reform it became a subdivision of the municipality Memaliaj. The population at the 2011 census was 1,379. The municipal unit consists of the villages Qesarat, Iliras, Amanikaj, Toç, Anëvjosë, Koshtan and Kamçisht.

References

Former municipalities in Gjirokastër County
Administrative units of Memaliaj
Villages in Gjirokastër County